The women's 100 metres event at the 1971 Pan American Games was held in Cali on 2 and 3 August.

Medalists

Results

Heats
Held on 2 August

Wind:Heat 1: +3.8 m/s, Heat 2: +4.4 m/s, Heat 3: +1.8 m/s

Semifinals
Held on 3 August

Wind:Heat 1: +2.7 m/s, Heat 2: +3.8 m/s

Final
Held on 3 August

Wind: +3.0 m/s

References

Athletics at the 1971 Pan American Games
1971